Staines Railway Bridge carries the Waterloo to Reading Line across the Thames in England.

Location
The bridge crosses Laleham Road and the river northeast to southwest from Staines-upon-Thames to Egham Hythe, Surrey, on the Staines Reach (between Penton Hook Lock and Bell Weir Lock).  The main Thames Path National Trail is beneath it and southern end of the Hythe towpath on the other bank.  Its linked viaducts cross various other roads including Chertsey Road (A320).

Traffic
The bridge carries the Waterloo to Reading Line and all trains serving its spur, the Weybridge or Chertsey Branch which connects this line to the four-track South West Main Line running from London Waterloo to the far south-west, merging with the Devon and Cornwall main line. The bridge is between Staines and Egham stations. The line is low gradient and forms a sharp curve for mid-speed traffic just north-east of here, to head through part of the town centre, finishing almost due east towards London.

The bridge was completed in 1856.

See also
Crossings of the River Thames

References

Bridges across the River Thames
Railway bridges in Surrey
Bridges completed in 1856
Staines-upon-Thames